Hanna Anna Kisteleki (born 10 March 1991 in Budapest) is a Hungarian water polo player. At the 2012 Summer Olympics and 2016 Summer Olympics, she competed for the Hungary women's national water polo team in the women's event. She is 5 ft 8 inches tall.

References

External links
 

Hungarian female water polo players
1991 births
Living people
People from Budapest
Olympic water polo players of Hungary
Water polo players at the 2012 Summer Olympics
Water polo players at the 2016 Summer Olympics
Universiade medalists in water polo
Universiade silver medalists for Hungary
21st-century Hungarian women